Philip Richard Hunt (10 January 1884 – 9 June 1946) was an Australian rules footballer who played with Melbourne in the Victorian Football League (VFL).

Notes

External links 

1884 births
Australian rules footballers from Victoria (Australia)
Melbourne Football Club players
1946 deaths